is a Japanese shōnen manga magazine published by Akita Shoten.

History
Shōnen Champion was first published on July 15, 1969. It has had numerous popular series by manga artists such as Osamu Tezuka, Go Nagai, Shinji Mizushima, Masami Kurumada, Keisuke Itagaki. The magazine is published every Thursday. It had a circulation of 250,000 from 1 October 2018 to 30 September 2019.

Currently running manga series
There are currently 21 manga titles being serialized in Weekly Shōnen Champion. Out of them, Saint Seiya: Next Dimension and Baki Gaiden: Scarface are published on an irregular basis.

Past series 
750 Rider
The Abashiri Family
AI no Idenshi
Akumetsu
Alabaster
Apocalypse Zero
Babel II
Baki the Grappler
Beastars
Black Jack by Osamu Tezuka
Clover
The Crater by Osamu Tezuka (1969-1970)
Cutie Honey by Go Nagai (1973-1974)
The Dangers in My Heart - transferred to Manga Cross
Dokaben by Shinji Mizushima (1972-1981)
Don Dracula
Duke Goblin
Eiken
Eko Eko Azarak
Hachigatsu no Cinderella Nine S - transferred to Manga Cross
Harigane Service
Hungry Heart: Wild Striker
Iron Wok Jan
Jitsu wa Watashi wa 
Kaze ga Gotoku
Low Teen Blues
Meika-san wa Oshi Korosenai
Mirai Keisatsu Urashiman
Mitsudomoe
Muteki Kanban Musume
My-Hime
My-Otome
Nanaka 6/17
Penguin Musume
Plawres Sanshiro
Rainbow Parakeet
Rokudou no Onna-tachi
Saint Seiya: Next Dimension
Saint Seiya: The Lost Canvas
s-CRY-ed
Seven of Seven
Shūjin Riku
Squid Girl 
Sugarless 
Super Radical Gag Family
Uchū Jūbe (肥前屋兵衛, "Treasure Hunter Jubei") by Hitoshi Tomizawa (1994-1995)
Yuuyake Banchō
Zenikko

References

External links
  
 

 
1969 establishments in Japan
Magazines established in 1969
Magazines published in Tokyo
Shōnen manga magazines
Weekly manga magazines published in Japan